William Risk Corbett (31 August 1922 – 31 July 2011) was a Scottish footballer who played as a centre-half.

Corbett made 60 official appearances for Celtic from 1946 to 1948 (having joined in 1941 during wartime) and also played for Preston North End, Leicester City, Yeovil Town, Dunfermline Athletic and Greenock Morton. He also appeared as a guest player for West Ham United in World War II.

His two brothers, David and Norman, were also footballers.

References

External links 
Scotland unofficial match profile at London Hearts Supporters Club

1922 births
2011 deaths
Celtic F.C. players
Scottish Football League players
Scottish Junior Football Association players
West Ham United F.C. wartime guest players
Maryhill F.C. players
Preston North End F.C. players
Leicester City F.C. players
Yeovil Town F.C. players
Dunfermline Athletic F.C. players
Greenock Morton F.C. players
Association football central defenders
Footballers from Falkirk
English Football League players
Scotland wartime international footballers
Scottish footballers